Marie-Alexandre Alophe (1812–1883) was a French photographer, painter and lithographer.

He received his artistic training from Camille Roqueplan and Paul Delaroche.

References

External links
 

1812 births
1883 deaths
19th-century French photographers
French lithographers
19th-century French lithographers
19th-century French male artists